The Society of the Army of the Potomac was a military society founded in 1869 which was composed of officers and enlisted men who served with the Army of the Potomac during the American Civil War.

History
After the conclusion of the Civil War, a number of organizations were founded by veterans of the Union armed forces to commemorate the service and sacrifice of those who had served the Union cause during the war.  The most prominent of these organizations were the Military Order of the Loyal Legion of the United States (MOLLUS) and the Grand Army of the Republic (GAR).  Several other organizations were also founded to commemorate specific organizations such as the Society of the Army of the Cumberland and the Society of the Army of Tennessee.

In 1869, the Society of the Army of the Potomac was founded and Lieutenant General Philip Sheridan was elected as its first president.  A total of 12 vice presidents were also elected, representing 10 corps which served with the army as well as the artillery and the general staff.

As the Society did not provide for hereditary membership, the Society gradually diminished as the veterans of the Civil War died off during the early twentieth century.  By 1906, the Society had diminished to only 350 members.  It held its last annual reunion in 1927.

Insignia
The Society had an elaborate insignia, made of gold, which was manufactured by Bailey, Banks and Biddle jewelers of Philadelphia.

The insignia has a top piece of crossed cavalry sabres, a blue and white ribbon, a pair of crossed cannons below the ribbon and a planchet in the form of a six armed cross enameled in red with the badges of six of the corps assigned to the army.  In the center of the cross is a seal with a crescent moon, a star and a cypher of the letters A and P.

Reproductions of the insignia, not made of gold, are sold on an on-line auction website.

Prominent members
Note - the rank indicated is the highest held by the individual either in the Regular Army or the Volunteers either during or after the Civil War.

General Ulysses S. Grant
General Philip Sheridan
Lieutenant General Samuel Baldwin Marks Young
Major General George Meade
Major General Ambrose Burnside
Major General Joseph Hooker
Major General George McClellan
Major General Daniel Butterfield
Major General Silas Casey
Major General Joshua Chamberlain
Major General George Custer
Major General Abner Doubleday
Major General George Sears Greene
Major General George Lewis Gillespie Jr.
Major General Winfield Scott Hancock
Major General Daniel Sickles
Major General Emory Upton
Major General Gouverneur K. Warren
Brevet Major General Henry Jackson Hunt
Brigadier General Lucius Fairchild
Brevet Brigadier General Nelson Viall
Brevet Colonel Elisha Hunt Rhodes
Brevet Major Augustus P. Davis

References

American Civil War veterans and descendants organizations
Organizations established in 1865
1865 establishments in the United States
Union Army
Military history of the United States